Ruiban-e Bozorg (also Romanized as Rū’ībān-e Bozorg; also known as Cham-e Emām Ḩasan, Ḩeydarīyeh Bozorg, and Rūbīān-e Bozorg) is a village in Howmeh Rural District, in the Central District of Gilan-e Gharb County, Kermanshah Province, Iran. At the 2006 census, its population was 173, in 41 families. The village is populated by Kurds.

References 

Populated places in Gilan-e Gharb County
Kurdish settlements in Kermanshah Province